Santa Fe – Carlos Jáuregui Station is a station on Line H of the Buenos Aires Underground which opened on July 12, 2016 on already operating section of the line.  The station combines with Line D at Pueyrredón station. It's located in the intersection of Santa Fe and Pueyrredón avenues, in the Buenos Aires barrio of Recoleta.

Originally known simply as Santa Fe, the station was renamed in honor of Carlos Jáuregui, an LGBT rights activist and founder of the Argentine Homosexual Community (CHA, Comunidad Homosexual Argentina), on 1 September 2016. The station was officially reinaugurated on 20 March 2017 by Chief of Government Horacio Rodríguez Larreta.

Gallery

References

External links

Buenos Aires Underground stations
Railway stations opened in 2016